Khavar-e Seyyed Khalaf (also Romanized as Khāvar-e Seyyed Khalaf; also known as Khāvar) is a village in Anaqcheh Rural District, in the Central District of Ahvaz County, Khuzestan Province, Iran. At the 2006 census, its population was 661, in 136 families.

References 

Populated places in Ahvaz County